Anthony Rose (born 27 April 1965) is a Jamaican boxer. He competed in the men's light welterweight event at the 1984 Summer Olympics. At the 1984 Summer Olympics, he lost to William Galiwango of Uganda.

References

External links
 

1965 births
Living people
Jamaican male boxers
Olympic boxers of Jamaica
Boxers at the 1984 Summer Olympics
Place of birth missing (living people)
Light-welterweight boxers
20th-century Jamaican people